Pseudogenes ornaticeps is a species of beetle in the family Cerambycidae, and the only species in the genus Pseudogenes. It was described by  Fairmaire in 1894.

References

Dorcasominae
Beetles described in 1894
Monotypic beetle genera